Abdolali Changiz is an Iranian football forward who played for Iran in the 1984 Asian Cup. He also played for Esteghlal, Al-Ahli and Al-Arabi. He was perhaps one of the finest football players of his generation in Iran and Asia.

International Records

Honours

International 
Asian Cup:
Fourth Place : 1984

Club 
 Tehran Provincial League
Winner: 2
1981–82 with Esteghlal FC
1984–85 with Esteghlal FC

Runner up: 2
1981–82 with Esteghlal FC
1987–88 with Esteghlal FC

Third Place: 1
1985–86 with Esteghlal FC

External links

Team Melli Stats

Iran international footballers
Iranian footballers
1959 births
Living people
Esteghlal F.C. players
Al Ahli SC (Doha) players
Iranian expatriate footballers
Footballers at the 1986 Asian Games
Association football forwards
Asian Games competitors for Iran
20th-century Iranian people